La novia de la Marina ( Navy's girlfriend) is a 1948 Argentine comedy film, directed by Benito Perojo and written by Gregorio Martinez Sierra and Manuel Alba. It was premiered on October 20, 1948.

The film narrates the story of a young rich woman who suffers from sleepwalking and a young man convinces her to marry with him.

Cast
 Susana Freyre
 Alberto Bello
 Ignacio de Soroa
 Nelly Duggan
 Luis Rodrigo
 Manolo Díaz
 Tito Climent
 Teresa Pintos
 Iván Grondona
 Alberto de Mendoza
 Susana Campos

External links
 

1948 films
1940s Spanish-language films
Argentine black-and-white films
Argentine comedy films
1948 comedy films
1940s Argentine films